Marie Ginette Petitpas Taylor  (born 1968 or 1969) is a Canadian politician who was elected to represent the riding of Moncton—Riverview—Dieppe in the House of Commons of Canada in the 2019 federal election. She is a member of the Liberal Party of Canada and a former Minister of Health, and is a member of the Canadian Branch of the Commonwealth Parliamentary Association as well as the Canadian NATO Parliamentary Association.

Early life and education
Petitpas Taylor grew up in Dieppe and graduated from the Université de Moncton with a bachelor's degree in social work.

Before politics
From 2004 to 2008, she was the chairwoman of the New Brunswick Advisory Council on the Status of Women, and has held a variety of other positions, including the coordinator for the Victim's Services Program of the local detachment of the Royal Canadian Mounted Police.

Political career
She won the Liberal Party's nomination for Moncton—Riverview—Dieppe on March 28, 2015, and won the riding in the election held on October 19, 2015.

On December 2, 2015, Prime Minister Justin Trudeau announced the appointment of Petitpas Taylor as deputy government whip. On February 15, 2016, Petitpas Taylor was sworn in as a Member of the Queen's Privy Council for Canada according to her duties as Deputy Government Whip.

She then succeeded Jane Philpott as Minister of Health in a cabinet shuffle on August 28, 2017.

She was re-elected in the 2019 federal election, and appointed Deputy Government Whip (for the second time) as well as a member of the Board of Internal Economy. She was re-elected in the 2021 federal election.

Electoral record

References

External links

 Official Website

1960s births
Living people
Members of the House of Commons of Canada from New Brunswick
Members of the King's Privy Council for Canada
Members of the 29th Canadian Ministry
Liberal Party of Canada MPs
Women government ministers of Canada
Women in New Brunswick politics
Canadian Ministers of Health
Women members of the House of Commons of Canada
Canadian social workers
Acadian people
Université de Moncton alumni
People from Dieppe, New Brunswick
People from Moncton
21st-century Canadian politicians
21st-century Canadian women politicians